The Ternopil Oblast Council is the regional oblast council (parliament) of the Ternopil Oblast (province) located in western Ukraine. The council is composed of 64 members and is situated in the oblast's administrative center Ternopil.

During the night of 29 to 30 August 2003 the leader of the Our Ukraine faction in the Ternopil Oblast Council, Ivan Havdyda, was assassinated in Kyiv.

Council members are elected for five year terms. A party must gain more than 5 percent of the total vote.

Recent elections

2020
Distribution of seats after the 2020 Ukrainian local elections

Election date was 25 October 2020

2015
Distribution of seats after the 2015 Ukrainian local elections

Election date was 25 October 2015

See also
2009 Ternopil Oblast local election

References

External links
 Ternopil Oblast Council (official site) 

Regional legislatures of Ukraine
Parliament
Unicameral legislatures